Yaxley may refer to:

 Yaxley (surname)
 Yaxley, Cambridgeshire (historically in Huntingdonshire), near Peterborough, England
 Yaxley F.C. a football club in Yaxley, Cambridgeshire
 Yaxley, Suffolk, near Eye, England
 Lord Yaxley, a minor fictional character in the Jeeves novels of P. G. Wodehouse, see Bertie Wooster
 Corban Yaxley, a death eater in J. K. Rowling's book Harry Potter and the Deathly Hallows
 Yaxley, a town in Felipe Carrillo Puerto Municipality, Quintana Roo, Mexico